The 1950–51 season was Cardiff City F.C.'s 24th season in the Football League. They competed in the 22-team Division Two, then the second tier of English football, finishing third.

Season review

Football League Second Division

Partial league table

Results by round

Welsh Cup
In the Welsh Cup, Cardiff started their campaign by scoring fifteen goals in two games with an 8–0 win over Barry Town followed by a 7–1 victory over Bangor City. After beating Wrexham 1–0, Cardiff suffered a 3–2 defeat to Merthyr Tydfil in a final replay.

Players

Fixtures and results

Second Division

FA Cup

Welsh Cup

See also
List of Cardiff City F.C. seasons

References

Cardiff City F.C. seasons
Association football clubs 1950–51 season
Card